Krzystof Ostrowski (born 3 May 1982) is a Polish former footballer who played as a midfielder. He played in 135 matches, scoring 4 goals in Ekstraklasa. In the 2008–09 season he won the league cup with Śląsk Wrocław.

Honours
Śląsk Wrocław
Ekstraklasa Cup: 2008–2009

External links
 

1982 births
Living people
Polish footballers
Legia Warsaw players
Zagłębie Lubin players
Śląsk Wrocław players
Widzew Łódź players
Ekstraklasa players
I liga players
IV liga players
Sportspeople from Wrocław
Association football midfielders